The 2017 NCAA Division III Cross Country Championships was the 45th annual NCAA Men's Division III Cross Country Championship and the 37th annual NCAA Women's Division III Cross Country Championship to determine the team and individual national champions of NCAA Division III men's and women's collegiate cross country running in the United States. In all, four different titles were contested: men's and women's individual and team championships.

The women's race team title was won by Johns Hopkins, defending their title from the previous year and winning their 5th title in program history. The women's individual title was won by senior Khia Kurtenbach of the University of Chicago, becoming the school's second cross country individual champion in program history (and first since 1999). In the men's race, the team title was won by North Central, their 18th title (and 2nd in a row). The Cardinals 139 point margin of victory was just 5 points from tying the men's championship record for largest margin of victory. The men's individual title went to Darin Lau of Wisconsin-Eau Claire, the 1st individual men's champion in school history.

Women's title
Distance: 6,000 meters

Women's Team Result (Top 10)

Women's Individual Result (Top 10)

Men's title
Distance: 8,000 meters

Men's Team Result (Top 10)

Men's Individual Result (Top 10)

See also
 NCAA Women's Division III Cross Country Championship
 NCAA Men's Division III Cross Country Championship

References 

NCAA Cross Country Championships
NCAA Division III championships
2017 in sports in Wisconsin